Aleksandr Vladimirovich Prokhorov (June 18, 1946 – January 7, 2005) was a Soviet football player and coach.

Honours
Dynamo Kyiv
 Soviet Top League champion: 1971

Individual
 Soviet Goalkeeper of the Year: 1974, 1975

International career
Prokhorov made his debut for USSR on March 20, 1976, in a friendly against Argentina. He played in the UEFA Euro 1976 quarterfinal (USSR did not qualify for the final tournament).

References

External links
 Profile 
 

1946 births
2005 deaths
Sportspeople from Brest, Belarus
Belarusian footballers
Soviet footballers
Soviet Union international footballers
Soviet football managers
Olympic footballers of the Soviet Union
Soviet Top League players
FC Neman Grodno players
FC Dinamo Minsk players
FC Metalurh Zaporizhzhia players
FC Dynamo Kyiv players
FC Spartak Moscow players
FC Asmaral Moscow players
Olympic medalists in football
FC Kaisar Kyzylorda managers
FC Shakhter Karagandy managers
FC Astana-1964 managers
Footballers at the 1976 Summer Olympics
Olympic bronze medalists for the Soviet Union
Medalists at the 1976 Summer Olympics
Association football goalkeepers